The Central District of Soltaniyeh County is in Zanjan province, Iran. At the National Census in 2006, the region's population (as Soltaniyeh District of Abhar County) was 28,266 in 7,282 households. The following census in 2011 counted 28,592 people in 8,395 households. At the latest census in 2016, the district had 17,987 inhabitants in 5,525 households, by which time the district had been separated from Abhar County to establish Soltaniyeh County.

References 

Soltaniyeh County

Districts of Zanjan Province

Populated places in Zanjan Province

Populated places in Soltaniyeh County

fa:بخش مرکزی شهرستان سلطانیه